Katherine Lauren Hill (born August 25, 1987) is an American former politician and social services administrator from Agua Dulce, California. A member of the Democratic Party, she served as the U.S. representative for California's 25th congressional district from January to November 2019. Hill is the former executive director of People Assisting the Homeless (PATH), a statewide non-profit organization working to end homelessness throughout California. She won her seat by defeating incumbent Republican Steve Knight in the 2018 midterm elections.

On October 18, 2019, RedState, a conservative blog, published a report on an alleged affair between Hill and her Legislative Director, which they both denied. On October 23, 2019, Hill admitted that she had had an inappropriate relationship with a campaign staffer before she became a Member of Congress. On October 27, 2019, she announced that she would resign from Congress. Nude photos of Hill were published by the Daily Mail, a British tabloid. Hill blamed the release of the photos on her ex-husband, called them an invasion of privacy and vowed to advocate for victims of revenge porn. She resigned on November 3, 2019, and left office two days later.

In June 2021, Hill was ordered to pay US$220,000 to the Daily Mail and other media, to reimburse the legal fees these companies spent defending themselves against her accusations.

Early life and education
Hill was born in Abilene, Texas, and grew up in the Saugus section of Santa Clarita, California. Her mother, Rachel, was a local registered nurse, and her father, Mike, was a police lieutenant. Hill attended public schools in the Santa Clarita Valley and graduated from Saugus High School in 2004. She attended California State University, Northridge where she earned a bachelor's degree in English and a Master of Public Administration.

Earlier career
Hill began her career as a policy advocate at People Assisting the Homeless (PATH), a nonprofit organization developing affordable and supportive services for the homeless in California. Her husband allegedly worked there as well, and it is claimed Hill was his boss. Later as the Executive Director for PATH, she raised the organization from a local force in Los Angeles County to one of the largest nonprofit providers of homes for the homeless in California. Hill helped pass a ballot initiative, Measure H, during spring of 2017 to help alleviate homelessness by providing $1.2 billion in funds for homeless services in Los Angeles County. Hill and her husband also raised goats in Agua Dulce, California.

U.S. House of Representatives

Elections

2018 

On March 8, 2017, Hill announced her candidacy for the U.S. House of Representatives for California's 25th congressional district, her home district, challenging incumbent Steve Knight, a Republican who had held the office since 2014. Knight won re-election in 2016.

In 2018, Hill came in second place in the primary election for California's 25th Congressional District, allowing her to advance to the November 6, 2018, general election, where she again faced Knight. In the general election, she defeated Knight by a 54% vs. 46% tally.

She was the subject of a documentary-style series of episodes that aired on the HBO show Vice News Tonight. The series documented the Hill campaign as the "most millennial campaign ever" for Congress. Vice News Tonight reportedly planned on doing a follow-up episode regarding Hill's advancement to the general election. In the weeks leading up to the midterm election, Hill was endorsed by former President Barack Obama, who also attended a campaign event in Southern California leading up to the election.

Political positions
Hill stated during her race for office that her top issues were addressing healthcare, rebuilding the middle class with policies that address income inequality and affordable housing, and getting big money out of politics. She also stated her support for Medicare for All.

Hill reportedly ran a grassroots campaign that didn't accept money from corporate political action committees. In the first quarter of 2018, she raised over $400,000, bringing her total to $1,092,025 raised, with more than 9,800 individual contributions and more than 5,100 individual donors.

Hill has supported comprehensive immigration reform while working towards greater funding and security along the southern border to counter primarily illegal drug trafficking and other various crimes. She also has supported some form of physical barrier along certain areas of the southern border.

According to an October 2018 article in Rolling Stone, Hill is an unabashed gun owner:

Tenure
Before the start of the 116th Congress, Hill and Colorado freshman U.S. Representative Joe Neguse were chosen as the freshman class representatives for the Democratic Caucus.

Committee assignments
 Committee on Armed Services
 Subcommittee on Seapower and Projection Forces
 Subcommittee on Tactical Air and Land Forces
 Committee on Oversight and Reform (Vice Chair)
 Subcommittee on Economic and Consumer Policy
 United States House Oversight Subcommittee on Environment
 Committee on Science, Space, and Technology
 Subcommittee on Space and Aeronautics

Caucus memberships 
 Congressional LGBT Equality Caucus (Co-Chair)
 Congressional Progressive Caucus
 New Democrat Coalition

Accusations of improper relationships

On October 18, 2019, the conservative political blog RedState published allegations that Hill was involved in an extramarital affair with her male legislative director. Hill denied such allegations, with Hill saying that her estranged husband, whom she described as abusive, was doing everything he could to humiliate her, and that her political opponents were exploiting a private matter for political gain. Her husband denied the allegations of abuse. Hill reached out to the Speaker of the House of Representatives Nancy Pelosi to deny the allegations.

On October 23, 2019, Hill sent an email to constituents in which she admitted to an inappropriate relationship with a campaign staffer before becoming a member of Congress. The relationship was with a 22-year-old female subordinate recently out of college. RedState also published nude photos of Hill as part of the story. Hill said that the U.S. Capitol Police opened an investigation into who may have leaked the photos.

Investigation 
The House Ethics Committee announced on October 23, 2019, that it would conduct an investigation into the allegation that Hill had an affair with her legislative director, which would be in violation of House ethics reforms that were implemented in 2018 in response to the #MeToo movement. Hill promised to cooperate with the Congressional ethics investigation regarding allegations of wrongdoing as a member of Congress.

Resignation 
On October 27, 2019, Hill announced via Twitter that she would resign from Congress: "This is the hardest thing I have ever had to do, but I believe it is the best thing for my constituents and our country." Speaker of the House Nancy Pelosi said Hill made "some errors in judgment that made her continued service as a Member untenable". Hill vowed to combat revenge porn after photos of her were leaked.

In her last speech before Congress on October 31, 2019, Hill said there was a "double standard" and "misogynistic culture" that resulted in her decision to step down from her position: 

On December 7, 2019, Hill penned an op-ed in The New York Times in which she described the events that led to her decision to resign, and mentions that she was suicidal during that time period.

Aftermath
In the special election held in the spring of 2020, Hill endorsed State Assemblywoman Christy Smith, who ultimately lost the election. Hill, whose PAC contributed $200,000, said that Smith had been considered "the mom of Democratic politics" in the district for years, and that "there's no one else that I could even think of that I would want to run for this." Some Democrats regretted Hill's involvement in the campaign.

After Hill's resignation, Monica Lewinsky reached out and offered to talk about some of the similarities and differences in being the victim of public shaming.

In December 2020, Hill filed a lawsuit against her ex-husband, the Daily Mail, and RedState over "non consensual porn". On April 7, 2021, a judge ruled in favor of the Daily Mail, finding that the photos are protected as "a matter of public issue or public interest" under the First Amendment to the United States Constitution. Hill's attorneys said they plan to appeal the decision. The judge also ordered Hill to pay roughly $220,000 in fees to the Daily Mail and a couple of journalists.

On April 5, 2021, Hill called for Matt Gaetz to resign in an opinion piece for Vanity Fair, after it was reported that Gaetz had allegedly shown pictures of naked women he claimed to have slept with, including to colleagues on the House floor. Gaetz had supported Hill after the leak of her photos, and Hill called him an "unlikely friend" during their time in Congress.

In July 2022, Hill declared bankruptcy.

Electoral history

Personal life 
Hill came out as bisexual after high school. She was California's first openly bisexual person to be elected to Congress.

Hill had a tattoo of an Iron Cross on her lower groin, which she got after a sexual assault as a teenager. The tattoo has since been covered over after photos were published in 2019.

In July 2010, Hill married Kenny Heslep, whom she began dating just after high school. They resided in Agua Dulce, California, on their farm, where they fostered rescue animals.  Heslep filed for divorce in 2019 and the divorce was settled in October 2020.  In December 2020, a judge awarded Hill a restraining order against her ex-husband. By July 2019, Hill was in a romantic relationship with Alex Thomas, a writer. Hill also rented an apartment in Washington, D.C., with freshman representative Lauren Underwood.

Hill's memoir, She Will Rise: Becoming a Warrior in the Battle for True Equality, in which she shares her experiences from her time in politics, was published in 2020.

See also
 List of federal political sex scandals in the United States
 List of LGBT members of the United States Congress
 Women in the United States House of Representatives

References

Bibliography

External links

 

1987 births
Living people
American feminists
21st-century American politicians
21st-century American women politicians
21st-century American writers
21st-century American women writers
Articles containing video clips
Bisexual feminists
Bisexual politicians
Bisexual women
California State University, Northridge alumni
Female members of the United States House of Representatives
LGBT members of the United States Congress
LGBT people from California
Democratic Party members of the United States House of Representatives from California
American memoirists